Beyler can refer to:

 Beyler, Buldan
 Beyler, Elmalı
 Beyler, İnebolu
 Beyler, Narman
 Bəylər